Maj. Frederic McLaughlin (27 June 1877 – 17 December 1944) was an American businessman and soldier. He was the first owner of the Chicago Black Hawks National Hockey League (NHL) ice hockey team.

Born in Chicago, Illinois, McLaughlin inherited the successful "McLaughlin's Manor House" coffee business from his father, who died in 1905. McLaughlin was a graduate of Harvard University and served in the United States Army during World War I. McLaughlin achieved the rank of Major and was often referred to as Major McLaughlin for the rest of his life.

Chicago Black Hawks
In May 1926, the NHL had granted an expansion franchise to former football star Huntington Hardwick and his syndicate of investors. On 1 June, McLaughlin, who had no experience in the ice hockey business, purchased the Chicago expansion franchise from Hardwick. He named the team the Black Hawks after the nickname of his army unit, the 86th Infantry "Blackhawk" Division, where he had served in the 333rd Machine Gun Battalion. Most of the Hawks players were from the Portland Rosebuds of the Western Hockey League purchased from WHL owner Frank Patrick for $100,000. During his 18 years as owner, McLaughlin would lead the franchise to two Stanley Cup wins, in 1934 and 1938.

At the time McLaughlin acquired the Black Hawks, he was married to Irene Castle, a famous dancer and film actress. She is credited with creating the "Indian head" design of the first Black Hawks sweater. McLaughlin was a "hands on" owner and he made 13 coaching changes in 18 years. One Hawk coach was Godfrey Matheson, who got the job when he met McLaughlin on the train and impressed McLaughlin with his hockey knowledge. Matheson lost the job after two games.

McLaughlin was fiercely patriotic, and at various times during his ownership would try to fill his roster with as many Americans as possible, during a time when very few American-born players played in the NHL. The 1938 Stanley Cup win was done with eight Americans on the roster and Bostonian Bill Stewart was coach. Stewart was fired early the next season.

As an owner, McLaughlin also feuded with other owners. James Norris, the Detroit owner, set up a competing Chicago team in the American Association, locking the Hawks out of the Chicago Stadium. The Norris family would eventually purchase the Hawks after McLaughlin's death. Conn Smythe, manager of Toronto supplies the following quote on McLaughlin:
Where hockey was concerned, Major McLaughlin was the strangest bird and, yes, perhaps the biggest nut I met in my entire life.

McLaughlin died of heart disease in Lake Forest at age 67. He was interred at Calvary Cemetery in Evanston. In 1963, he was inducted into the Hockey Hall of Fame as a builder.

Notes

References

External links
 
 

1877 births
1944 deaths
Burials at Calvary Cemetery (Evanston, Illinois)
Chicago Blackhawks executives
Harvard University alumni
National Hockey League executives
Hockey Hall of Fame inductees
Sportspeople from Chicago
Stanley Cup champions